Gory Gory Hallelujah is a 2003 American comedy horror musical film directed by Sue Corcoran, written by Angie Louise, and starring Tim Gouran, Angie Louise, Jeff Gilbert, Todd Licea, Keith Winsted, Jason Collins, and Joseph Franklin.  On a road trip, a group of actors confronts Elvis impersonators, religious extremists, and zombies.

Plot 
After they each fail their audition for Jesus in a play, a Jew, a militant African American, a feminist, and a bisexual hippie go on a road trip.  On the way, they confront hostile Elvis impersonators and end up in a fight.  Fleeing the law, they end up in an intolerant religious community that holds the secret of the apocalypse; a botched magical spell reveals it to be a zombie apocalypse.  Zombies kill everyone but Jessie, who lives among them and decides to study their culture.

Cast 
 Tim Gouran as Sky
 Angie Louise as Jessie
 Jeff Gilbert as Rahim
 Todd Licea as Joshua
 Keith Winsted as Preacher John
 Jason Collins as Ralph Peed
 Joseph Franklin as Mo Jack

Release 
Gory Gory Hallelujah had a limited release in January 2005 and made $12,604. It was released on DVD October 30, 2006.

Reception 
Dennis Harvey of Variety called the film "heavy-handed and devoid of wit".  Ashley Cooper of Film Threat rated the film 3/5 stars and called it a refreshing B movie that doesn't take itself seriously.  Bill Gibron of DVD Talk rated the film 4.5/5 stars and wrote, "Though it's smartly realized narrative kind of falls apart toward the end, and its breakneck pacing means that much of the subtleties get lost in the chaos, Gory Gory Hallelujah is still one exciting, engaging film."  Peter Dendle called it a lackluster independent film with "a few painful song-and-dance numbers".

References

External links 
 
 
 

2003 films
2003 horror films
American independent films
American comedy horror films
American zombie comedy films
2003 comedy horror films
2000s musical comedy films
2003 directorial debut films
2003 comedy films
American exploitation films
American splatter films
American black comedy films
Religious horror films
Films critical of religion
American satirical films
2000s English-language films
2000s American films